Tokuda is a Japanese surname. Notable people with the surname include:

, Japanese badminton player
Jill Tokuda, American politician
Keiichi Tokuda, Japanese engineer
Kip Tokuda (1946–2013), American social worker and politician
, Japanese politician
, Japanese porn actor
, Japanese handball player
, Japanese author
, Japanese politician
, Japanese potter

Japanese-language surnames